Forged in Fire is an American competition series that airs on the History channel and is produced by Outpost Entertainment, a Leftfield Entertainment company.

In each episode, four bladesmiths compete in a three-round elimination contest to forge bladed weapons, with the overall winner receiving $10,000 and the show's championship title "Forged in Fire Champion". The series has a host (formerly Wil Willis for the first seven seasons, currently hosted by Grady Powell) and a three-judge panel consisting of J. Neilson (Jason Knight during portions of season 3 and 4; Ben Abbott during portions of season 4th, 5th, 6th and remaining in the 7th season), David Baker, and Doug Marcaida: experts in weapon making, history and use.

The History channel ordered an initial eight episodes of the series  with the first program premiering on Monday, June 22, 2015, at 10pm ET. Season two premiered on February 16, 2016, and increased to 10 episodes. The third season premiered with a "Champion of Champions" match on August 23, 2016, and was announced as having 16 episodes. The fourth season premiered on April 11, 2017, with a "Judges' Pick" episode in which the four judges (Neilson, Knight, Baker, Marcaida) each selected one smith from past seasons to compete again. The fifth season premiered on March 7, 2018. The sixth season premiered on February 6, 2019. The seventh season premiered on October 9, 2019, and expanded into May 6, 2020. The eighth season premiered on November 18, 2020.

Format 
The set, referred to as "The Forge," is stocked with a wide range of metalworking equipment, including propane forges, coal forges, grinders, power hammers, and hydraulic presses. Medical personnel are present to treat any injuries or other health problems and may, at their discretion, disqualify smiths who are unable to continue safely. At the end of each round, the smith whose weapon is judged to be the least satisfactory must surrender it and leave the competition.

In a typical episode, the four smiths are presented with a quantity of steel that they must use in the first round to forge a blade in a style of their choosing. In some episodes, they all begin with the same starting material; in others, they may choose from an assortment of metal objects or must salvage their material from a source such as a junked car or lawnmower. The host states one set of criteria concerning blade or blade/tang length, and often a second set for a feature that must be incorporated, such as serrations or a fuller groove. The smiths are given 10 minutes to sketch out their designs, followed by three hours to forge the blades; they need not adhere to their original designs. Once the time expires, the judges evaluate the blades based on the host's criteria and inspect their craft, quality, and design, then deliberate privately before announcing their decision. Any smiths who fail to meet the criteria or who fail to turn in a blade at all are subject to immediate elimination.

For the second round, the three remaining smiths are given an additional two (originally three) hours to turn their blades into fully operational weapons. They must attach a handle, choosing from a range of provided materials, and incorporate any additional special features stated by the host. They must also grind, sharpen, and polish the blades, and may address any flaws or issues pointed out by the judges in the first round, if they choose to do so. After the time expires, the judges put each weapon through a series of tests to gauge properties such as sharpness, durability, and ease of use. For these tests, the weapons are used to chop/slash/stab objects that include ropes, ice blocks, animal bones/carcasses, and metal plumbing pipes. If one weapon suffers a catastrophic failure, defined as damage that renders it unsafe or ineffective for further testing, its maker is immediately disqualified. In the case of catastrophic failure by multiple weapons, the worst performer is eliminated. The judges may, at their discretion, choose not to subject a weapon to a particular test if it is sufficiently cracked or flawed.

In the third round, the two remaining smiths are shown a historically significant (and technically difficult) weapon, mostly prepared by David Baker, and are given four (originally five) days to create a version of it. They return to their home forges to do the work and must comply with any specifications set by the host. Afterward, they return to the Forge and submit their weapons for testing against objects and environments similar to the historical scenarios in which they were typically used. Based on the test results, the judges select one smith to receive the $10,000 prize and the day's championship title.

Rule changes 
Some episodes have incorporated modifications to the rules, as follows:
 Extension or omission of the 10-minute design period in the first round.
 Omission of a required special feature in the first round.
 Not revealing the purpose of the blade in the first round.
 Extension or shortening of the three-hour forging time in the first and/or second rounds, depending on the difficulty level of the blade design and any special features.
 Shortening of the three-hour time to attach a handle in the second round to two hours.
 Requiring the smiths to forge a blade of a specific style in the first round.
 Omission of the requirement to attach a handle in the second round.
 Shortening of the working time from five days to four in the third round.
 Testing of weapon properties after the first round.

Personnel

Hosts 
 Wil Willis (seasons 1–7) is a former Army Ranger (Third Ranger Battalion) and decorated Air Force para-rescue specialist. Willis' previous television experience includes Special Ops Mission and Triggers, two series that aired on the former Military Channel.
 Grady Powell (season 8–present), a former U.S. Army Green Beret, replaced Wil Willis as the show's host as of the Season Eight premiere on November 18, 2020. Powell's previous television experience includes two seasons starring on Dual Survival on the Discovery Channel.

Judges 
 , a knife and sword expert, holds the rank of Master Smith within the American Bladesmith Society (ABS). He has over 20 years' experience in making knives and edged weapons. He examines the weapons' technical qualities and tests their durability. In Season 3, Neilson took a leave of absence to have surgery on his hand and returned in later episodes of Season 4.
 David Baker, a Hollywood prop maker who has appeared on the Spike TV series Deadliest Warrior, is an authority on weapons history and an expert on replicating period-accurate weapons for both museums and films. He judges the weapons' historical accuracy and aesthetic beauty.
 Doug Marcaida, an edged-weapons specialist, is a U.S. military contractor, martial arts instructor, and knife designer for FOX Knives Italy. Specializing in the Southeast Asian fighting style of Kali, he has taught classes in weapon awareness and use for military, law enforcement, and security organizations. He also designs "the most dangerous knives in the world", owns and sells his own line of knives. Marcaida evaluates the smiths' weapons to determine their effectiveness in combat with his famous kill tests. His catchphrase is to declare of a worthy weapon: "It will KEAL" (i.e., "Keep Everyone Alive"). He also tests the weapon's sharpness and if deemed worthy, receives the declaration "It will cut". When he is unable to test weapons himself due to injury, Marcaida brings in his brother R.J. or one of his students to perform the task in his place.
 Jason Knight, another ABS Master Smith, filled Neilson's seat on the judges' panel during his medical absence in Season 3. Neilson appeared alongside Knight for the Season 4 premiere; Neilson resumed his seat in the eighth episode.
 Ben Abbott, a nine-time Forged in Fire champion as of February 2022, debuted as a judge starting with the 21st episode of the fourth season. Abbott would replace Neilson in some episodes after Season 5 and replace Baker when Baker participates in the final round in Super Champion Edition (Season 7) and Beat the Judges episodes. In season eight, Ben took on multiple opponents in a five-part "Beat the Unbeaten" series. He remained undefeated and brought his record in the forge to 9–0. Abbott remains the only undefeated judge save Jason Knight who never participated in the competition, Neilson having lost in a Beat the Judges episode and Baker having lost in the Super Champion Edition episode.

Background and production

Development 
Tim Healy and Steve Ascher are executive producers for History. Jodi Flynn, Brent Montgomery, David George, Shawn Witt and Simon Thomas are executive producers for Outpost Entertainment. Healy observed the demonstration, and later the filming, from the sidelines. Healy says that the inspiration for Forged in Fire came from his and other developers' love of food competition shows such as Chopped and Iron Chef. However, in order to appeal to the History channel's audience, they decided to have the competition focus on historical weaponry.

Casting 

Typically, candidates for Forged in Fire episodes go through a casting call and screening process before appearing and competing on the show. For example, Doug Marcaida shared a casting call to his Facebook page on October 18, 2021, seeking "...metal workers to forge iconic edged weapons from History!". After applying to be on the show, the potential competitors are interviewed by video and phone; asked questions about their metallurgy knowledge, experience, and skills; and undergo background checks. Sometimes, the entrants are asked to build a weapon with particular specifications, with progress pictures being sent to and analyzed by the show's producers before being considered to compete on an episode.

On occasion, former contestants are invited back to the show to participate in another competition. As examples, bladesmiths have reappeared and competed in a military branch tournament, "Second Chance Tournament", or a broken blade "revenge" episode, just to name a few.

Filming and set design 
Forged in Fire episodes are filmed at Brooklyn Fireproof Stages in Brooklyn, New York City, New York, in a safe, professional environment.

The set is composed of a large judge's table from where the judges spectate throughout the episode, 3 or 4 main work tables for contestants, large shelving units dubbed the "pantry" for various handle materials, and large quantities of various metal types, grades, sources, and shapes. The rest of the set floor is spotted with other work stations for tools and equipment such as Venturi forges (made and supplied by Majestic Forge), a variety of hammers, steel files, wire brushes, anvils, foot-operated power hammers, hydraulic presses, electric buffer wheels, grinding wheels, vises, welding machines, and other hand and electric tools. Safety equipment is also found throughout the set and is used during construction and testing of weapons.

The winning blades from each episode are showcased on the "Winners Wall" of the filming studio. Some of those blades can be seen on the wall behind the standing contestants during testing portions of various episodes. As the show's sign of respect and gratitude for the participant's effort, time, and labor that went into making each weapon, non-winning blades are returned to the competitors after the respective episode has aired.

Release

Series overview

Special episodes 
The "Master & Apprentice" episode in Season 4 featured four master/apprentice pairs of smiths. Only one member of each pair was allowed to work at any time, trading off every 30 minutes in the first two rounds and every day in the third. The non-working member was allowed to offer advice. For this episode, the forging time in the first round was extended to three and a half hours.

The "Ultimate Champions Edition" (Season 4) and "Rookies Edition" (Season 5) each featured five smiths instead of four. The smiths were required to forge a particular type of blade at their homes and bring those weapons to the studio for a preliminary test. One smith was eliminated based on the results of this test, after which the competition proceeded through the normal three rounds.

On October 3, 2018, a five-week Invitational Tournament premiered, consisting of four preliminary heats and a finale. Four smiths with a particular specialty (farrier, armorer, blacksmith, metalworker) competed in each preliminary heat, with the winners advancing to the finale for a $50,000 prize. Dave Parthemore of Connecticut won.

A "Battle of the Branches" tournament began on May 8, 2019, with four smiths from a different branch of the United States armed services (Army, Navy, Air Force, Marines) competing in each preliminary heat.

During the 2019 season, Forged in Fire aired "enhanced" episodes called Forged in Fire: Cutting Deeper, which featured bonus scenes of older episodes with expert tips and techniques from the judges like Dave Baker explaining what happened to each blade during the weapon tests. Each episode was two hours long (made up of 2 older one-hour episodes), highlighting blade themes such as "Revolutionary War Swords" and "Curved Blades", etc.

On May 13, 2020, a special episode titled Forged in Fire: Meet the Judges aired at 8/9c on History. The judges J. Neilson, Dave Baker, and Doug Marcaida, were in the "hot seat" as fans asked them questions about the show, their personal lives, and bladesmithing techniques.

On November 24, 2021, a special episode titled "Bladesgiving" aired at 10 p.m. EST on History. Before the Thanksgiving fest, comes the hunt in which the Forged In Fire team showcased classic hunting weapons. The episode relived five showdowns between championship hunting blades, bows and spears made by some of the forge's bladesmiths.

Home media and streaming services 
Aside from viewing Forged in Fire episodes on History's cable channel and its internet website, there are other subscription options to watch the show. On October 1, 2021, seasons 1, 2, 3, 6, and 7 were added to Discovery+, with season 4 being added to the streaming platform on February 1, 2022. On November 21, 2021, Netflix began airing episodes, albeit one season at a time. There are three seasons (87 episodes) available on Hulu. Episodes from all seasons are available on iTunes, Amazon Prime Video, Google Play, and Vudu on a "Buy/Rent" basis.

Reception

Accolades

Influence 
In the city of Cohoes, New York near Albany, a man, inspired by the series, tried to forge a piece of metal over a fire in a barrel near his home. He caused a fire that destroyed three residential buildings and damaged 28 others.

Series spin-offs 
Several competition shows have been created as Forged in Fire spin-offs.

Knife or Death 

On April 17, 2018, a spin-off series titled Forged in Fire: Knife or Death premiered on History. This series is hosted by Bill Goldberg and co-hosted by Tu Lam, a martial arts expert and retired member of the Green Berets.

Beat the Judges 
On June 3, 2020, another spin-off series titled Forged in Fire: Beat the Judges premiered on History, hosted by Willis. On each episode, three previous Forged in Fire champions return to compete for an opportunity to face one judge (Neilson, Baker, or Abbott) and win another $10,000. For the first round (level 1), the three smiths each brought one weapon to the Forge in a style of their choosing and created at their home forges, and submit them for testing by Doug Marcaida. The second round (level 2) follows the same format as the third round in a typical Forged in Fire episode. However, the two remaining smiths are given only three days to forge an example of the featured weapon at their home forges. In the third round (level 3), the last remaining smith and the competing judge are given eight hours to create a fully functional example of a particular weapon type in the Forge, including handle fitting and grinding/sharpening/polishing. The other judges then test the weapons and choose the $10,000 winner. The competing judge is announced at the start of the third round; if he wins, the prize is donated to the charity of his choice. J. Neilson (Melanoma Foundation), Dave Baker (Breast Cancer Research), and Ben Abbott (Black Horse Forge: free blacksmithing classes to First Responders and Veterans).

Episodes

Notable contestant achievements 
 Ben Abbott

Ben Abbott entered seasons 2 and 3 as a contestant and won the "Champion of the Forge" title in both. He debuted as a judge in season 4 of Forged in Fire and later participated in the Forged in Fire: Beat the Judges challenge in 2020, winning the title twice more. Abbott then went on to win five more times in the "Beat the Unbeaten" challenge series in season 8 of Forged in Fire.

 Jesse Hu

Jesse Hu won eight times back-to-back in four episodes during the "Gladiators of the Forge" challenge in season 9. In the particular challenge series, contestants were given the choice to continue competing until eliminated. Jesse entered the contest in the third of ten total events, won against Kurt Komyati, chose to continue, and won seven more events thereafter.

See also 
 List of martial arts weapons
 Weapon

Notes

References

External links 
 
 

2015 American television series debuts
2010s American reality television series
2020s American television series
English-language television shows
History (American TV channel) original programming
Television shows set in New York City
Television shows about weaponry
Reality competition television series